Matthew Grinlaubs (born 9 June 1971) is former professional beach volleyball player who competed for Australia in the men's tournament of the 2000 Summer Olympics with Josh Slack. They finished seventeenth.

References

External links
 
 
 
 

1971 births
Living people
Australian men's beach volleyball players
Beach volleyball players at the 2000 Summer Olympics
Olympic beach volleyball players of Australia